The 29th Annual Grammy Awards were held on February 24, 1987, at Shrine Auditorium, Los Angeles, California. They recognized accomplishments by musicians from the previous year.

Paul Simon won Album of the Year for Graceland, and Burt Bacharach and Carole Bayer Sager won Song of the Year for "That's What Friends Are For".

Award winners
Record of the Year
"Higher Love" – Steve Winwood
Russ Titelman & Steve Winwood, producers
"Sledgehammer" – Peter Gabriel
Peter Gabriel & Daniel Lanois, producers
"Greatest Love of All" – Whitney Houston
Michael Masser, producer
"Addicted to Love" – Robert Palmer
Bernard Edwards, producer
"That's What Friends Are For" – Dionne Warwick & Friends; Elton John, Gladys Knight & Stevie Wonder
Burt Bacharach & Carole Bayer Sager, producers
Album of the Year
Graceland – Paul Simon
Paul Simon, producer
So – Peter Gabriel
Peter Gabriel & Daniel Lanois, producers
Control – Janet Jackson
Janet Jackson, Jimmy Jam & Terry Lewis, producers
The Broadway Album – Barbra Streisand
 Peter Matz, producer
Back in the High Life – Steve Winwood
 Russ Titelman & Steve Winwood, producers
Song of the Year
"That's What Friends Are For" 
Burt Bacharach & Carole Bayer Sager, songwriters (Dionne Warwick & Friends; Elton John, Gladys Knight & Stevie Wonder)
"Sledgehammer"
Peter Gabriel, songwriter (Peter Gabriel)
"Addicted to Love"
Robert Palmer, songwriter (Robert Palmer)
"Higher Love"
Steve Winwood & Will Jennings, songwriters (Steve Winwood)
"Graceland"
Paul Simon, songwriter (Paul Simon)
Best New Artist
 Bruce Hornsby & the Range
 Glass Tiger
 Nu Shooz
 Simply Red
 Timbuk3

Blues
Best Traditional Blues Recording
Albert Collins, Johnny Copeland & Robert Cray for Showdown!

Children's
Best Recording for Children
Jim Henson, Kathryn King & Geri Van Rees (producers) for The Alphabet performed by the Sesame Street cast

Classical
Best Classical Orchestral Recording
Michael Haas (producer), Georg Solti (conductor) & the Chicago Symphony Orchestra for Liszt: A Faust Symphony
Best Classical Vocal Soloist Performance
André Previn (conductor), Kathleen Battle & the Royal Philharmonic Orchestra for Kathleen Battle Sings Mozart 
Best Opera Recording
Elizabeth Ostrow (producer), John Mauceri (conductor), James Billings, Joyce Castle, Maris Clement, David Eisler, Jack Harrold, John Lankston, Erie Mills, Scott Reeve & the New York City Opera Orchestra for Bernstein: Candide
Best Choral Performance (other than opera)
James Levine (conductor), Margaret Hillis (choir director) & the Chicago Symphony Orchestra & Chorus for Orff: Carmina Burana
Best Classical Performance - Instrumental Soloist or Soloists (with or without orchestra)
Vladimir Horowitz for Horowitz - The Studio Recordings, New York 1985
Best Chamber Music Performance
Emanuel Ax & Yo-Yo Ma for Beethoven: Cello Sonata No. 4; Variations
Best Contemporary Composition
Witold Lutosławski (composer) & Esa-Pekka Salonen (conductor) for Lutosławski: Symphony No. 3
Best Classical Album
Thomas Frost (producer) & Vladimir Horowitz for Horowitz - The Studio Recordings, New York 1985

Comedy
Best Comedy Recording
Bill Cosby for Those of You With or Without Children, You'll Understand

Composing and arranging
Best Instrumental Composition
John Barry (composer) for Out of Africa
Best Arrangement on an Instrumental
Patrick Williams (arranger) for "Suite Memories" performed by Bill Watrous & Patrick Williams 
Best Instrumental Arrangement Accompanying Vocals
David Foster (arranger) for "Somewhere" performed by Barbra Streisand

Country
Best Country Vocal Performance, Female
Reba McEntire for "Whoever's in New England"
Best Country Vocal Performance, Male
Ronnie Milsap for Lost in the Fifties Tonight
Best Country Performance by a Duo or Group with Vocal
The Judds for "Grandpa (Tell Me 'Bout the Good Ol' Days)"
Best Country Instrumental Performance (orchestra, group or soloist)
Ricky Skaggs for "Raisin' the Dickens"
Best Country Song
Jamie O'Hara (songwriter) for "Grandpa (Tell Me 'Bout the Good Old Days)" performed by The Judds

Folk
Best Traditional Folk Recording
Doc Watson for Riding the Midnight Train
Best Contemporary Folk Recording
Al Bunetta, Dan Einstein & Hank Neuberger (producers) for Tribute to Steve Goodman performed by various artists

Gospel
Best Gospel Performance, Female 
Sandi Patti for Morning Like This
Best Gospel Performance, Male 
Philip Bailey for Triumph
Best Gospel Performance by a Duo or Group, Choir or Chorus
Deniece Williams & Sandi Patti for "They Say"
Best Soul Gospel Performance, Female
Deniece Williams for "I Surrender All"
Best Soul Gospel Performance, Male
Al Green for "Going Away"
Best Soul Gospel Performance by a Duo or Group, Choir or Chorus
The Winans for Let My People Go

Historical
Best Historical Album
Aziz Goksel & Bob Porter (producers) for Atlantic Rhythm and Blues 1947-1974, Vols. 1-7 performed by various artists

Jazz
Best Jazz Vocal Performance, Female
Diane Schuur for Timeless
Best Jazz Vocal Performance, Male
Bobby McFerrin for "Round Midnight"
Best Jazz Vocal Performance, Duo or Group
2+2 Plus for Free Fall
Best Jazz Instrumental Performance, Soloist
Miles Davis for Tutu
Best Jazz Instrumental Performance, Group
Wynton Marsalis for J Mood
Best Jazz Instrumental Performance, Big Band
Doc Severinsen for The Tonight Show Band with Doc Severinsen
Best Jazz Fusion Performance, Vocal or Instrumental
Bob James & David Sanborn for Double Vision

Latin
Best Latin Pop Performance
José Feliciano for "Le Lo Lai"
Best Tropical Latin Performance
Rubén Blades for Escenas
Best Mexican-American Performance
Flaco Jiménez for Ay Te Dejo en San Antonio y Más!

Musical show
Best Cast Show Album
Thomas Z. Shepard (producer) & the original 1986 cast for Follies in Concert

Music video
Best Music Video, Short Form
Dire Straits for "Dire Straits - Brothers in Arms"
Best Music Video, Long Form
Michael Apted (video director) & Sting for Bring on the Night

New Age
Best New Age Recording
Andreas Vollenweider for Down to the Moon

Packaging and notes
Best Album Package
Eiko Ishioka (art director) for Tutu performed by Miles Davis 
Best Album Notes
Andrew Sarris, Frank Conroy, Gary Giddins, Jonathan Schwartz, Murray Kempton, Stephen Holden & Wilfrid Sheed for The Voice - The Columbia Years 1943-1952 performed by Frank Sinatra

Polka
Best Polka Recording
Eddie Blazonczyk for Another Polka Celebration performed by Eddie Blazonczyk's Versatones
Jimmy Sturr for I Remember Warsaw performed by Jimmy Sturr & His Orchestra

Pop
Best Pop Vocal Performance, Female
Barbra Streisand for The Broadway Album 
Best Pop Vocal Performance, Male
Steve Winwood for "Higher Love"
Best Pop Performance by a Duo or Group with Vocal
Dionne Warwick, Elton John, Gladys Knight & Stevie Wonder for "That's What Friends Are For"
 Best Pop Instrumental Performance, (Orchestra, Group or Soloist)
Harold Faltermeyer & Steve Stevens for "Top Gun Anthem"

Production and engineering
Best Engineered Recording, Non-Classical
Jason Corsaro and Tom Lord-Alge (engineers) for Back in the High Life performed by Steve Winwood
Best Engineered Recording, Classical
Paul Goodman (engineer) & Vladimir Horowitz for Horowitz - The Studio Recordings, New York 1985
Producer of the Year (Non-Classical)
Jimmy Jam and Terry Lewis
Classical Producer of the Year
Thomas Frost

R&B
Best R&B Vocal Performance, Female
Anita Baker for Rapture
Best R&B Vocal Performance, Male
James Brown for "Living in America"
Best R&B Performance by a Duo or Group with Vocal
Prince and  The Revolution for "Kiss"
Best R&B Instrumental Performance (Orchestra, Group or Soloist)
Yellowjackets for "And You Know That"
Best Rhythm & Blues Song
Anita Baker, Gary Bias & Louis A. Johnson (songwriters) for "Sweet Love" performed by Anita Baker

Reggae
Best Reggae Recording
Steel Pulse for Babylon the Bandit

Rock
Best Rock Vocal Performance, Female 
Tina Turner for "Back Where You Started"
Best Rock Vocal Performance, Male
Robert Palmer for "Addicted to Love"
Best Rock Performance by a Duo or Group with Vocal
Eurythmics for "Missionary Man"
Best Rock Instrumental Performance (Orchestra, Group or Soloist)
Art of Noise & Duane Eddy for "Peter Gunn"

Spoken
Best Spoken Word or Non-musical Recording
Johnny Cash, Jerry Lee Lewis, Chips Moman, Ricky Nelson, Roy Orbison, Carl Perkins & Sam Phillips for Interviews From the Class of '55 Recording Sessions

References

 029
1987 in California
1987 music awards
1987 in Los Angeles
1987 in American music
Grammy
February 1987 events in the United States